Hepburn is an unincorporated community in Center Township, Posey County, in the U.S. state of Indiana.

History
A post office was established at Hepburn in 1898, and remained in operation until it was discontinued in 1905.

Geography

References

Unincorporated communities in Posey County, Indiana
Unincorporated communities in Indiana